Derrick James Mason (born January 17, 1974) is an American former professional football player who was a wide receiver for fifteen seasons in the National Football League (NFL). He was drafted by the Tennessee Oilers in the fourth round of the 1997 NFL Draft after playing college football for the Michigan State Spartans. Following eight seasons with the Oilers franchise (which was renamed the Titans in 1999), including two Pro Bowl selections (2000 and 2003), Mason signed with the Baltimore Ravens in 2005. He became the Ravens' all-time leading receiver with 5,777 yards from 2005 to 2010. He spent 2011 with the New York Jets and Houston Texans. Mason retired as a Baltimore Raven on June 11, 2012. He was the last active NFL player to have played for the Oilers.

Early years
Mason attended Mumford High School in Detroit, Michigan. He set a school record for both catches (70) and receiving yards (1,243).

College career
Mason played college football at Michigan State. During his four-year career, he set a team record for kick off return yards of 2,384. He also caught eight touchdowns.

He played under Nick Saban in 1995 and 1996 where he would catch 106 passes for 1,652 yards and 6 TD.  He also played alongside Muhsin Muhammad in 1995.

Professional career

Tennessee Titans
Mason started his career with the Oilers/Titans after being drafted in the fourth round (98th overall) in the 1997 NFL Draft. In his rookie season, he played in 16 games recording 14 catches for 186 yards. He made his NFL debut versus the Oakland Raiders on August 31. The following season, he again played in all 16 games and this time recording 25 catches for 333 yards and three touchdowns, the first of his career came versus the Chicago Bears on October 25. He also returned 31 punts for 228 yards. In the 1999 season, Mason gained 1,030 yards returning punts and kickoffs, and added 8 kickoff returns for 322 yards and a touchdown in the team's three playoff games,  assisting the Titans to Super Bowl XXXIV where he returned 5 kickoffs for 122 yards and caught 2 passes for 18 yards in Tennessee's 23–16 loss. He also returned a kickoff 80 yards for a touchdown in the Titans 33-14 win over the Jacksonville Jaguars in the AFC title game. In the 2000 season, he led the NFL in punt return yards (662) while also catching 63 passes for 895 yards and returning 41 kickoffs for 1,132 yards (an NFL leading 27 yards per return average), giving him 2,690 combined receiving and special teams yards, breaking the NFL record for all-purpose yards in a single season previously held by Lionel James (2,535). Darren Sproles broke Mason's record in 2011 with 2,696 yards. He is only the second player in Titans history to pass the 2,000 yard mark. He earned his first trip to the Pro Bowl. In 2001, he started 15 games and scored 9 touchdowns, a career-high. Just as he had done the previous season, he went past the 2,000 all purpose yards mark, the first Titan to do this in consecutive seasons. The following season, he started in 14 games and led the team in a number of categories including receptions, reception yards and touchdowns. In 2003, he started all 16 games and finished the season with 1,303 receiving yards and 95 receptions which was the 5th highest in the NFL. The following season, in 2004, he again started all 16 games and was ranked 2nd in the NFL with 96 receptions for 1,168 yards and seven touchdowns.

Baltimore Ravens
Mason signed with the Baltimore Ravens as a free agent on March 7, 2005. In his first year with the team, he started in all 16 games and recorded 86 receptions, a Ravens franchise season record. In 2006, he played in 16 games with 15 starts and finished the campaign with 68 receptions for 750 yards and two touchdowns. Mason caught the pass that gave Steve McNair 30,000 passing yards for his career in the 19-7 win in the season finale against the Buffalo Bills. The following year, Mason had 103 receptions for 1,087 yards and five touchdowns. Mason became the first player in Ravens history to record 100 receptions in a season. He also had a 79-yard score.

In 2008, Mason was selected as a third alternate wide receiver for the Pro Bowl. In 2008, he had 80 receptions for 1,037 receiving yards and 5 touchdowns.  He was the primary target for rookie quarterback Joe Flacco. Mason dislocated his shoulder when he fell after a catch in a game against the Houston Texans, eventually coming back to finish the contest. Mason also played with a shoulder he separated against the New York Giants. Mason re-aggravated of his injury against the Dallas Cowboys, but finished the game with six catches for 66 yards and one touchdown. He led the team with a postseason career-high 12 receptions for 190 yards, including a postseason career long 48-yard touchdown reception.

The 2009 season saw Mason continue his solid production with 73 catches for 1,028 yards. Mason scored seven times, two more than the previous year.

On November 21, 2010, Mason caught his 900th reception, becoming the 13th receiver in NFL history to do so. In a 2010 game against the Carolina Panthers, Mason and Flacco got into an argument on the sidelines. Mason was reportedly upset that Flacco was late in getting a pass to him. The two apparently settled their differences. Mason had 61 catches for 802 yards and seven scores that season.

When the NFL announced the new collective bargaining agreement on July 25, 2011, the Ravens announced their intention to release Mason upon the start of free agency to free salary cap space. He was formally released by the team on July 28.

New York Jets
Mason signed with the New York Jets on August 6, 2011. His statistical production was limited. Also, there were some problems in the team locker room. Some said that Mason was a cancer to the team, and that he complained about offensive coordinator Brian Schottenheimer's playcalling. Said Mason, "I never complained to Rex Ryan or Mike Tannenbaum, and I hope that one day it come out who actually did it, but I doubt it." Mason said in a report published by Scout.com. "I never went to Rex or Mike to complain about Brian's play-calling."

Houston Texans
The Jets traded Mason to the Houston Texans on October 11, 2011, in exchange for a conditional seventh-round draft pick. Mason caught only six passes for 55 yards with the team. He was later released on December 12.

Retirement
Mason announced his retirement from professional football by signing a 1-day contract with Baltimore Ravens on June 11, 2012.

NFL career statistics

Career awards and highlights
 AFC Champion (1999)
 2× Pro Bowl selection (2000, 2003)
 All-Pro selection (2000)
 NFL punt return yards leader (2000)
 NFL All purpose yards leader (2000)
 3× AFC Special Teams Player of the Week (Week 12, 1999, Week 4, 2000, Week 10, 2001)
 10,000 Receiving Yards Club
 15,000 All-Purpose Yards Club

NFL records
 All-purpose yards in a single season (2000): 2,690 (broken in 2011 by Darren Sproles)
 Kick return yards in a single postseason (1999): 437
 Only player with 10,000 receiving yards and 5,000 return yards

Oilers/Titans franchise records
's NFL off-season, Derrick Mason held at least 26 Titans franchise records, including:
 Most career combined kickoff and punt return yards (5,086)
 Most career punt returns (182)
 Most punt returns in a single season: 51 (2000)
 Most punt return yards in a single season: 662 (2000)
 Most all-purpose yards in a single season: 2,690 (2000)
 Most all-purpose yards (playoff career): 997
 Most Kick Returns (playoff career): 17
 Most Kick Returns (playoff season): 13 (1999)
 Most Kick Returns (playoff game): 5 (2000-01-30 STL Superbowl; tied with Bobby Jancik and John Simon)
 Most Kick Ret Yds (playoff career): 492
 Most Kick Ret Yds (playoff season): 437 (1999)
 Most Kick Ret Yds (playoff game): 174 (2000-01-23 @JAX)
 Most Yds/KR (playoff career): 28.94
 Most Yds/KR (playoff season): 33.62 (1999)
 Most Yds/KR (playoff game): 43.5 (2000-01-23 @JAX)
 Most Kick Ret TDs (playoff career / season / game): 1 (2000-01-23 @JAX)
 Most Punt Returns (playoff career): 21
 Most Punt Returns (playoff season): 11 (1999)
 Most Punt Ret Yds (playoff career): 173
 Most Yds/PR (playoff game): 16.33 (2000-01-16 @IND)
 Most Total Return Yds (playoff career): 665
 Most Total Return Yds (playoff season): 515 (1999)

Ravens franchise records
 Most career receiving yards (5,777)
 Most career receptions (471)
 Most receptions in a single season: 103 (2007) (broken by Mark Andrews in 2021 with 107)
 Best receptions per game average: 6.4 (2007) (broken by Steve Smith Sr. in 2015 with 6.6) 
 Most seasons with 1,000 receiving yards (4)

Pro Bowl records
 Most returns in a single game: 8 (2004) (broken by Marc Mariani in 2011 with 9)

Personal life
Mason and his wife, Marci, were married on June 7, 1997 and have a daughter, Bailee My-Lin and a son, Derrick James II. Marci is "The Derrick Mason Foundation" organization's Vice President.

In 2012, Mason was hired as the wide receivers coach at Ensworth High School in Nashville, Tennessee alongside former teammate, linebackers coach, Lemanski Hall.

Mason was previously a morning radio host for 102.5 The Game, a sports station based in Nashville.
 
Mason has ownership stake in Nashville Company SWIFTWICK.

References

External links
 Ravens Player Bio
 Derrick Mason Blog

1974 births
Living people
Mumford High School alumni
American football wide receivers
Michigan State Spartans football players
Tennessee Oilers players
Tennessee Titans players
Baltimore Ravens players
New York Jets players
American Conference Pro Bowl players
Houston Texans players
Players of American football from Detroit
10,000 receiving yards club